The 1955 Boston College Eagles football team represented Boston College as an independent in the 1955 college football season. Led by fifth-year head coach Mike Holovak, the Eagles compiled a record of 5–2–1. Boston College played home games at Alumni Field in Chestnut Hill, Massachusetts and Fenway Park in Boston. Team captain John Miller went on to play four seasons in the National Football League (NFL).

The team won its first three games and was ranked No. 17 in the AP Poll after those three victories. The team suffered its first loss to Xavier, and one week later lost a close game to the Miami Hurricanes by a 14–7 score.

In the annual Green Line Rivalry game, Boston College gained 420 yards and defeated Boston University, 40–12, before a crowd of 25,827.

The final game of the season was a 26–7 victory over rival Holy Cross in front of 37,235 fans at Fenway Park.

Schedule

References

Boston College
Boston College Eagles football seasons
Boston College Eagles football
1950s in Boston